Tracey Prescott & Lonesome Daddy is the debut studio album by Canadian country music trio Tracey Prescott & Lonesome Daddy. It was released by Columbia Records in 1992. It includes the top 10 single "When You're Not Loving Me".

Track listing

References

1992 debut albums
Prescott-Brown albums
Columbia Records albums